Naugaon is an Indian village in (Pauri Garhwal/Uttrakhand/Bharat).

External links
http://villages.euttaranchal.com/PauriGarhwal/Pauri/Chhaitur/06020163

Villages in Pauri Garhwal district